Amerila bubo is a moth of the subfamily Arctiinae. It was described by Francis Walker in 1855. It is found in Angola, the Democratic Republic of the Congo, Ethiopia, Kenya, Malawi, Namibia, Rwanda, South Africa, Tanzania, Uganda, Zambia and Zimbabwe.

References

Moths described in 1855
Amerilini
Moths of Africa